Fisherman's Son or The Fisherman's Son may refer to:
O Filho do Pescador (The Fisherman's Son), a novel by Brazilian author Antônio Gonçalves Teixeira e Sousa
Zvejnieka dēls (Fisherman's Son), a novel by Latvian author Vilis Lācis
, Latvian film by the novel of Lācis
, Latvian film by the novel of Lācis
The Fisherman's Son, a Georgian variant of the Armenian fairy tale "The Golden-Headed Fish"
"Fisherman's Son", a track from North Country (album) by Canadian folk music group The Rankin Family
The Fisherman's Son, a 1959 novel by American writer Eleanor Frances Lattimore